The following is a list of battles fought by the Republic of Venice, from the traditional date of its founding in 697 until its dissolution in 1797, organized by date. The list includes both land and sea engagements, and is not exhaustive.

9th century

10th century

11th century

12th century

13th century

14th century

15th century

16th century

17th century

18th century 

Venice
 
Venice battles
Battles